The Xiaomi Mi Smart Band 5 (Xiaomi Mi Band 5 in China) is a wearable activity tracker produced by Xiaomi Inc. It was announced in China on 11 June 2020, and went on sale on 18 June 2020 in China, with a Global version released on 15 July 2020 as Xiaomi Mi Smart Band 5. It was released in India on 29th September, 2020. It has a 1.1-inch, 126x294 resolution capacitive AMOLED display and 24/7 heart rate monitoring claiming a 50% more accurate PPG sensor than its predecessor. It supports a charging dock that locates using a magnet which is said to be easier to use than previous generation chargers. The NFC-enabled version also has an in-built microphone for Xiaomi's in-built assistant Xiao.

The Global Mi Smart Band does not have features such as Alexa Support, NFC and SpO2 tracking.

Specifications
 Display: 1.1-inch (2.72cm) AMOLED, full color touch screen
 Dialog DA14697 (Arm Cortex M33)
 Colour depth: 16-bit
 Screen brightness: Up to 450 nits
 Resolution: 126x294
 Button: Single touch button (wake up, return)
 Connectivity: Bluetooth version 5.0 BLE, NFC on some models
 RAM: 512 KB
 Storage: 16 MB
 Battery: LiPo, 125 mAh, 14 days of battery life (NFC), 20 days (non-NFC)
 Sensors: accelerometer, gyroscope, PPG heart rate sensor, capacitive proximity sensor and infrared sensor (NFC Variant)
 Waterproof: up to 50 metres for 30 minutes, 5 atmospheres

Functions
Heart rate monitor (24/7), Step counter, 11 workout modes (Outdoor running, Indoor running ,Walking, Cycling, Indoor cycling, Pool swimming, Freestyle, Elliptical, jump rope, yoga, rowing machine), personal activity intelligence), camera controller, weather alerts, near-field communication (in some models), timer, stopwatch, rapid eye movement sleep + sleep monitor, women's health tracking, alarms, reminders, notifications, call mute and Call decline, Find phone, Silent phone, Brightness +/- and other minor features, Music controller, sedentary reminder, event reminder, breathing exercises, stress counter. Chinese version only: virtual assistant, microphone.

See also
 Xiaomi
 Xiaomi Mi Band 4
 Xiaomi Mi Band 6

References 

Sports equipment
Wearable computers
Activity trackers
Xiaomi
Products introduced in 2020
Smart bands